This is a list of flag bearers who have represented Lithuania at the Olympics.

Flag bearers carry the national flag of their country at the opening ceremony of the Olympic Games.

See also
Lithuania at the Olympics

References

Lithuania at the Olympics
Lithuania
Olympic flagbearers